The Actinomycetia are a class of bacteria.

Taxonomy
The currently accepted taxonomy is based on the List of Prokaryotic names with Standing in Nomenclature (LPSN) and National Center for Biotechnology Information (NCBI).

 Acidothermales Sen et al. 2014
 Actinomycetales Buchanan 1917 (Approved Lists 1980)
 Actinopolysporales Goodfellow and Trujillo 2015
 Bifidobacteriales Stackebrandt et al. 1997
 Catenulisporales Donadio et al. 2015
 Cryptosporangiales Nouioui et al. 2018
 Frankiales Sen et al. 2014
 Geodermatophilales Sen et al. 2014
 Glycomycetales Labeda 2015
 Jatrophihabitantales Salam et al. 2020
 Jiangellales Tang et al. 2015
 Kineosporiales Kämpfer 2015
 Micrococcales Prévot 1940 (Approved Lists 1980)
 Micromonosporales Genilloud 2015
 Mycobacteriales Janke 1924 (Approved Lists 1980)
 Nakamurellales Sen et al. 2014
 Propionibacteriales (Rainey et al. 1997) Patrick and McDowell 2015
 Pseudonocardiales Labeda and Goodfellow 2015
 Sporichthyales Nouioui et al. 2018
 Streptomycetales Cavalier-Smith 2002
 Streptosporangiales Goodfellow 2015

Phylogeny

See also
 List of bacteria genera
 List of bacterial orders

References 

Actinomycetota
Bacteria classes